Tanyp-Chishma (Tanıp-Şişmä) is a rural locality (a village) in Nizhnebaltachevsky Selsoviet, Tatyshlinsky District, Bashkortostan, Russia. The population was 18 as of 2010. There is 1 street.

Geography 
Tanyp-Chishma is located 17 km east of Verkhniye Tatyshly (the district's administrative centre) by road. Nizhneye Kaltayevo is the nearest rural locality.

References 

Rural localities in Tatyshlinsky District